Mana is the debut studio album by the Dutch gothic metal band Nemesea, released in 2004.

Track listing

Personnel

Band members
Manda Ophuis - lead vocals, alto and soprano in the choir
Hendrik Jan de Jong - guitars, voice and grunts, producer, strings and choir arrangements
Martijn Pronk - guitars
Berto Boijink - keyboards
Sonny Onderwater - bass
Chris Postma - drums

Additional musicians
Peter van Dijk - voice on tracks 2 and 5
Jeroen Kriek - vocals on track 5
Ido Gerard Kampenaar - percussion

Strings
Segei Arseniev - violin
Jan Buizer - viola
Sietse Jan Weijenberg - cello

Choir
Judith Bouma, Saskia de Vries - sopranos
Marieke Bouma, Mirjam Leentvaar - altos
Gerard van Beijeren - tenor
David van Royen - bass

Production
Berthus Westerhuis, Bauke van der Laaken - engineers
Klaas Pot - mixing

References

Mana
Mana